Araneus viridiventris is a species of spiders described by Takeo Yaginuma in 1969, found in China, Taiwan, India, and Japan. A. viridiventris is included in the genus Araneus in the family Araneidae. No subspecies are listed.

References

External links

viridiventris
Spiders described in 1969
Spiders of Asia